Soldier's Home is a 1977 American short film adaptation of the 1925 short story of the same name by Ernest Hemingway which was originally broadcast as part of The American Short Story series on PBS on April 25, 1977. It was directed by Robert Young, adapted by Robert Geller and starred Richard Backus and Nancy Marchand.  The musical score is by Dick Hyman.

Premise 
Soldier's Home is the story of Harold Krebs, who returns from World War I to his home town, and finds challenges in re-entering society.

Cast
 Harold Krebs - Richard Backus
 Mrs. Krebs - Nancy Marchand
 Roselle - Lane Binkley
 Kenner - Mark La Mura

References

External links  
 

1977 television films
1977 films
1977 short films
1977 drama films
American drama short films
Films based on works by Ernest Hemingway
Films directed by Robert Young
1970s English-language films
1970s American films